Loleatta is the third studio album recorded by American singer Loleatta Holloway, released in 1977 on the Gold Mind label. Another Holloway album titled Loleatta was released in 1973.

History
The album features the singles "Worn Out Broke Heat", which peaked at #25 on the Hot Soul Singles chart, and "Dreamin'", which peaked at #72 on the Billboard Hot 100. "Hit and Run" also charted at #56 on the Hot Soul Singles chart. The album was remastered and reissued with bonus tracks in 2013 by Big Break Records.

Track listing

Personnel
Sigma Sound Studios
Earl Young – drums
Ron Baker – bass
Norman Harris, Bobby Eli, T.J. Tindall, Roland Chambers – guitars
Ron Kersey, Cotton Kent, T.G. Conway – keyboards
Larry Washington, – congas
Vincent Montana Jr. – vibes
Barbara Ingram, Evette Benton, Carla Benson – background vocals
Jack Faith – flute
Robert Hartzell, Rocco Bene – trumpets
Roger De Lillo, Fred Joiner, Richard Genovese, Robert Moore – trombones
Joe De Angelis, Milton Phibbs, Jeffery Kirschen – French horns
Don Renaldo, Rudolph Malizia, Richard Jones, Gov Hutchinson, Charles Apollonia, Americus Mungiole, Diane Barnett, Christine Reeves – violins
Davis Barnett, Anthony Sinagoga – violas
Romeo Di Stefano – cello

Paragon Studios
Quentin Joseph – drums
Bernard Reed – bass
Bobby Eli, John Bishop – guitars
Tennyson Stephens – keyboards
Emanuel Willis, Henry Gibson – congas
Lionel Bordelon, Eddie Shedosky – trumpets
Gene Chausow, Bill Klinghoffer – French horns
Morris Ellis, Tillman Buggs – trombones
James Mack – flute
Ruth Goodman, Jerry Sabrensky, Joe Golan, Everett Mirsky, Sol Bobrov, Elliott Golub, Fred Spector – violins
Lee R. Lane, Roger Moulton, Harold Kupper – violas

Charts
Singles

References

External links 
 

1977 albums
Loleatta Holloway albums
Albums produced by Norman Harris
Albums recorded at Sigma Sound Studios
Gold Mind Records albums